Halorubrum is a genus in the family Halorubraceae. Halorubrum species areusually halophilic and can be found in waters with high salt concentration such as the Dead Sea or Lake Zabuye.

Genetic exchange
A population of the haloarchaea Halorubrum in its natural high salt concentration environment exchanged genetic information frequently by recombination.  This population exhibited a degree of linkage equilibrium approaching that of a sexual population.

Taxonomy
In taxonomy, Halorubrum is a genus of the Halobacteriaceae.

Species
Halorubrum ejinorense was first isolated from Lake Ejinor in Inner Mongolia, China.

Halorubrum lacusprofundi was first isolated in the 1980s from Deep Lake, Antarctica. Its genome, sequenced in 2008, consists of two chromosomes (one 2.74 Mb and the other 0.53 Mb) and one plasmid (0.43 Mb). Its β-galactosidase enzyme has been extensively studied to understand how proteins function in low-temperature, high-saline environments. 
One strain of H. lacusprofundi contains a plasmid for horizontal gene transfer, which takes place via a mechanism that uses vesicle-enclosed virus-like particles.

Halorubrum sodomense was first identified in the Dead Sea in 1980. It requires a higher concentration of Mg2+ ions for growth than related halophiles. Its cell surface membrane contains Archaerhodopsin-3 (AR3), a photoreceptor protein which harvests the  energy from sunlight to establish a proton motive force that is used for ATP synthesis. Mutants of AR3 are widely used as tools in optogenetics for neuroscience research.

Halorubrum tibetense was first isolated from Lake Zabuye in Tibet, China.

Halorubrum xinjiangense was first isolated from Xiao-Er-Kule Lake in Xinjiang, China.

Proposed species
Several species and novel binomial names have been proposed, but not validly published.
published.
 Halorubrum africanae and Halorubrum constantinense were isolated in Algeria and proposed as new species in 2007 and 2005.
 Halorubrum alimentarium and Halorubrum koreense are the proposed names for the undescribed strains B43 and B6, appearing in a publication of 2008.
 Halorubrum halotolerans is the proposed name for an undescribed strain isolated from solar salterns in Baja California in 2009.
 Halorubrum hochstenium is the proposed name for the full genome of the undescribed strain ATCC 700873, supplied to databases in 2014.
 Halorubrum jeotgali was isolated from samples of traditional Korean seafood and proposed as new species in 2007. Halorubrum cibarium was proposed in the same publication. It was proposed again under the name H. cibi and accepted in 2009. 	
 Halorubrum kribbense and Halorubrum norisence''' are proposed names of unisolated strains from the human gut microbiome, referenced in a publication in 2017.
 Halorubrum salipaludis was first published in 2021.
 Halorubrum salsamenti was isolated from salt brine and proposed as new species in 2017.
 Halorubrum sfaxense was isolated in Tunisia and proposed as new species in 2017.
 Halorubrum tropicale'' was isolated in Puerto Rico and proposed as new species in 2016.

References

Further reading

Scientific journals

Scientific books

Scientific databases

External links

Halorubrum at BacDive -  the Bacterial Diversity Metadatabase

Archaea genera
Taxa described in 1996